The Rabbitkettle Formation is a geologic formation in the Yukon, comprising thin bedded silty and occasionally siliciclastic limestones deposited in deep (below storm wave base) waters. It preserves fossils dating back to the Ordovician period.

According to  it:
 Starts in the Late Cambrian; ends in late Tremadoc
 reaches 750m in thickness
 transitional slope facies
 Alternation of black calcareous mudstones and grey, burrowed wackestones

See also

 List of fossiliferous stratigraphic units in Yukon

References

 

Ordovician Yukon
Cambrian northern paleotropical deposits
Ordovician northern paleotropical deposits